The Great Western Railway (GWR) 4500 Class or Small Prairie is a class of 2-6-2T steam locomotives.

History 
They were designed as small mixed traffic locomotives, mainly used on branch lines. The design was based on the earlier 4400 Class, but with larger driving wheels and altered wheel spacing. A total of 75 were built; 55 were built in four batches between 1906 and 1915 and a fifth batch of 20 locos was built in 1924, during Collett's tenure at Swindon. The first two batches were originally numbered 2161–2190 but were renumbered 4500–4529 during 1912. The first batch (2161–2180) is significant in that it was the last batch of locos built at Stafford Road Works, Wolverhampton. Of this batch 2168 (as 4507) was the last Wolverhampton-built loco to remain in service with BR, not being withdrawn until 1963. The final two batches built were nos. 4530–4554 in 1913-15 and nos. 4555–4574 in 1924.

The 4575 Class was a later development with larger side tanks.

Rhondda and Swansea Bay Railway and Port Talbot Railway
The Rhondda and Swansea Bay Railway (R&SBR) had been worked by the GWR since 1 July 1906, although it was not absorbed until 1 January 1922. In April 1907, the GWR sent three new locomotives of the first batch, nos. 2165–7, to the R&SBR; these were given R&SBR numbers 31–33. The Port Talbot Railway (PTR) was absorbed by the GWR on 1 January 1908, but its locomotive fleet remained separate until 1 January 1922. In March 1909, R&SBR nos. 31 and 32 were transferred to the PTR, regaining their GWR numbers 2165 and 2166. These two were returned to the GWR in 1912, being renumbered 4504 and 4505 in December that year. No. 33 was not returned until January 1914, when it was renumbered 4506.

Preservation 
Three of the class still exist, two of them survivors from Woodham Brothers scrapyard in Barry, Vale of Glamorgan, South Wales. All of them have run in preservation.

4555 
4555 was bought in working order from British Railways by Patrick Whitehouse and fellow Talyllyn Railway member Pat Garland, so has never had to be restored. Originally working on the Dart Valley Railway, she later moved to the Dartmouth Steam Railway. She returned to steam in 2020 after having been under a major overhaul since 2014. Currently on a 3-year loan to the East Somerset Railway from March 2020.

4561 
This locomotive left Woodham Brothers in September 1975. It is currently undergoing an extensive overhaul on the West Somerset Railway, having been out of service since 1998.

4566 

Currently stored out of service on the Severn Valley Railway awaiting an overhaul, this locomotive left Woodham Brothers in August 1970. It returned to service in late 2006 following an overhaul and after several years painted in Great Western green, was repainted into BR unlined black with the early crest for the first time in preservation. It was withdrawn from service in January 2017 following the expiry of her boiler certificate. It is on display inside the Engine House at Highley until its turn to overhaul comes again.

See also
GWR 4400 Class
GWR 4575 Class
 List of GWR standard classes with two outside cylinders

References

External links 

 4400 / 4500 tank classes
 4566 Overhaul

4500
2-6-2T locomotives
Standard gauge steam locomotives of Great Britain
Railway locomotives introduced in 1906